Olivia Époupa (born 30 April 1994) is a French basketball player for the Fenerbahçe Safiport.

Personal life
Born in France, Époupa is of Cameroonian descent.

References

External links

1994 births
Living people
Basketball players at the 2016 Summer Olympics
French expatriate basketball people in Australia
French expatriate basketball people in Turkey
French sportspeople of Cameroonian descent
French women's basketball players
Galatasaray S.K. (women's basketball) players
Olympic basketball players of France
Point guards
Basketball players from Paris
France women's national basketball team players
Fenerbahçe women's basketball players